Myanmar National Airlines, formerly Union of Burma Airways, Burma Airways, and Myanma Airways, is a state-owned airline and the flag carrier of Myanmar, based in Yangon. Founded in 1948, the airline operates scheduled services to all major domestic destinations and to regional destinations in Asia. Its main base is Yangon International Airport.

History 

The airline was founded by the government after independence on 15 September 1948, as the Union of Burma Airways (UBA). It initially operated domestic services only, but added limited international services to neighboring destinations in 1950. In 1993 the airline withdrew from its international routes. After a 23-year absence, they relaunched foreign services in 2016 with service to Singapore. The name was changed to Burma Airways in December 1972, and to Myanma Airways on 1 April 1989, following the renaming of the country from Burma to Myanmar. International services of Myanma Airways have been made as a joint venture airline, Myanmar Airways International (MAI). Myanmar National Airlines is the majority shareholder of Joint Venture Company MAI, set up in 1993.
In 2003, it was proposed to set up a Myanmar-based airline for chartered international passenger and cargo flights, which was planned to be called Air Myanmar. What would have been a joint-venture between Myanma Airways and private investors was abandoned in 2005. Myanmar National Airlines provides ground-handling services for Other airline's charter, schedule and non schedule flight.

In mid-2012, Myanma Airways ordered to lease two new Embraer 190AR from GE Civil Aviation Services Co. Ltd, that replaced its Fokker F-28 from November 2012. On February 11, 2014, at the Singapore Airshow, Myanma Airways signed a $960 million deal with GECAS for four Boeing 737-800s,six Boeing 737 MAX. The deal is the largest commercial sale by a U.S. company to Myanmar in decades and is the largest single aircraft order in the history of Myanmar's aviation industry.

In December 2014, Myanma Airways rebranded itself as Myanmar National Airlines.

Following the arrival of its first Boeing 737-800 in June 2015, Myanmar National Airlines announced the resumption of international services after a 22-year hiatus to Singapore, Hong Kong and Bangkok. International services resumed with the inaugural flight to Singapore on 19 August 2015. Myanmar National Airlines then launched its second international service to Hong Kong on 4 December 2015 following the arrival of its second Boeing 737-800. Myanmar National Airlines (MNA) sets to begin its flights between Yangon and Bangkok starting from February 20, 2016, marking Thailand as its third international destination.

Destinations

Fleet

Current fleet
The Myanmar National Airlines fleet comprises the following aircraft :

Former fleet
The airline previously operated the following aircraft (as of November 2022):
 1 ATR 42-320
 2 ATR 72-200
 1 ATR 72-500
 1 Boeing 727-200
 3 Boeing 737-800
 2 Embraer 190

Services

Mingalarbar Service
The service is complimentary for Business Class passengers, and to Premium Economy and Economy passengers for an extra fee. Services include amenities such as Fast Track Immigration and Security, assistance on arrival, limo service to and from Yangon International Airport, priority check-in and access to Mingalabar lounges in both the international and domestic terminals of Yangon International Airport.

Cabin
Myanmar National Airlines has been introducing new cabin interiors and in-flight entertainment since June 2015 on their new fleet of Boeing 737-800 and ATR 72-600 aircraft.

Business class
Business Class is only available on the new Boeing 737-800 aircraft. The Business Class seats have 21 in (53 cm) width and recline to 42 in (107 cm) of pitch and feature electrical outlet and leg rest. A 9 in (23 cm) PTV is located in the seatrest offers AVOD.

Premium Economy class

Premium Economy is available on the Embraer 190 and new Boeing 737-800 aircraft. The seat pitch is 36 inches – four inches more than Economy Class and have a bigger recline. In-seat power outlet and streaming inflight entertainment is offered only on the Boeing 737-800 aircraft.

Economy class
Economy class is offered on all of MNA's aircraft. The Economy Class seats are 17.2 in (44 cm) in width on the Boeing 737-800 and 18 in (46 cm) on Embraer 190 aircraft with 32 in (81 cm) of pitch, while the ATR 72-600 and Grand Caravan offer 17 in (43 cm) in width and a seat pitch between 30 and 32 inches. In-seat power outlet and streaming inflight entertainment is offered only on the Boeing 737-800 aircraft.

Inflight entertainment
Myanmar National Airlines offers streaming in-flight entertainment called airstreamUB on its Boeing 737-800 aircraft. Passengers will be able to watch movies, TV shows and listen to music via in-seat monitors or on their own smartphone, tablet (iOS or Android), or laptop over a wireless connection on board the aircraft. airstreamUB is available free of charge. Customers travelling in business class also have the option to access airstreamUB on the in arm monitor fitted in their seat.

Accidents and incidents

Union of Burma Airways
 On 14 March 1949, de Havilland DH.104 Dove 1, registration XY-ABO, crashed in Gulf of Mottama (Martaban) en route from Mingaladon Airport to Moulmein (Mawlamyine) Airport. Lost 9 passengers and 2 crew (Capt P H Sparrow, Pilot and L.A. Stephens, Radio officer).
 On 26 June 1954, Douglas DC-3 was hijacked by members of the Karen National Defense Organization (KNDO, later the Karen National Liberation Army). After the killing of Saw Ba U Gyi in 1950, the first president of the Karen National Union (KNU), the group sought to regain both a political initiative and financial leverage. Three KNDO members - Major Saw Kyaw Aye, Captain Thein Kyaw and Captain A Nyein - planned to hijack a plane, and use it to smuggle illegal weapons. They successfully hijacked the plane, and forced its British pilot Captain A.E. Hare to land on a deserted beach, after other group members had failed to build a suitable temporary runway in Karen. Finding 700,000 Burmese kyat in metal chests in the cargo, cash being transported between bank branches, they confiscated this and then let the plane take off. Censorship banned reporting of the story for over 50 years, but in April 2014 it was the subject of the book The World's First Hijacking, and is being developed into a Hollywood-produced film under the same title.
 On 2 September 1955, Douglas C-47A XY-ACQ struck Mount Popa (28 miles east of Lanywa) en route from Meitkila to Lanywa, killing all nine on board.
 On 8 August 1956, Douglas C-47B XY-ADC struck Mount Pindaya (near Thazi), killing 11 of 22 on board. 
 On 10 June 1963, Douglas C-47A XY-ACS struck Mount Kaolokung, China, killing all 20 on board.
 On 23 May 1969, Douglas DC-3 XY-ACR crashed on approach to Lashio Airport following a loss of control, killing all six people on board. The aircraft was operating a domestic non-scheduled passenger flight.
 On 16 August 1972, a Douglas C-47B, registration XY-ACM, crashed shortly after take-off from Thandwe Airport on a scheduled passenger flight. Twenty-eight people on board were killed and only 3 survived.
 On 24 August 1972, Vickers Viscount 761D XY-ADF was damaged beyond economic repair at Sittwe Airport when it departed the runway on landing and the undercarriage collapsed. All 43 on board survived.

Burma Airways
The former Burma Airways had a poor safety record, but later, as Myanma Airways, it maintained its safety record under ICAO and Myanmar DCA regulations and requirements:
 On 8 September 1977, de Havilland Canada Twin Otter 300 XY-AEH crashed into Mount Loi Hsam Hsao, killing all 25 on board.
 On 25 March 1978, Fokker F-27 Friendship 200 XY-ADK lost height and crashed into a paddy field just after takeoff from Mingaladon Airport, killing all 48 people on board.
 On 21 June 1987, a Burma Airways Fokker F-27 Friendship 200 slammed into an 8200 feet mountain 15 minutes after takeoff from Heho Airport, killing all 45 people on board.
 11 October 1987, a Burma Airways Fokker F-27 Friendship 500 crashed into a 1500 feet high mountain, killing all 49 people on board. This was Myanmar's second-deadliest air disaster, surpassed only by the crash of a Myanmar Air Force Shaanxi Y-8 in 2017, which killed 122 people. Thirty-six foreigners—14 Americans, seven Swiss citizens, five Britons, four Australians, three West Germans, two French citizens and one Thai—were among the dead.

Myanma Airways
 On 27 January 1998, Myanma Airways Flight 403, a Fokker F27 crashed while taking off from Yangon, Myanmar, killing 16 of the 45 people on board.
 On 24 August 1998, Myanma Airways Flight 635 crashed into a hill on approach to Tachilek Airport killing all 36 on board.
 On 6 June 2009, Myanma Airways Flight 409, Fokker F28-4000, registration XY-ADW, overran the runway at Sittwe Airport. The aircraft was damaged beyond repair.

Myanmar National Airlines                                                    
 On 12 May 2019, Myanmar National Airlines Flight 103 made an emergency landing at Mandalay International Airport after the nose landing gear failed to deploy. None of the 89 passengers were hurt.
 On 30 September 2022, amid the Myanmar civil war, a bullet launched from the ground penetrated the fuselage of a Myanmar National Airlines ATR 72 aircraft as it was landing in Loikaw Airport. Among the 63 passengers on board, the only injury was from a 27-year-old male passenger, whose right cheek was struck by the bullet and received medical attention upon landing. The State Administration Council accused the People's Defence Force and Karenni National Progressive Party for shooting the aircraft, but the latter has denied responsibility for the incident.

See also
List of airlines of Burma

References

External links

  Myanma Airways
  Myanma Airways
  Official website

 
Airlines of Myanmar
Government-owned airlines
Airlines established in 1948
1948 establishments in Asia
1948 establishments in Burma
Government-owned companies of Myanmar